Marco De Gasperi (born 5 April 1977) is an Italian male mountain runner, sky runner and long-distance runner.

Biography
He won five gold medals at senior level (from 1997 to 2007) and one at junior level (1996), at the World Mountain Running Championships. At European level he won 5 medals individual (1 gold, 2 silver, 2 bronze) and 6 gold medal with the national team at the European Mountain Running Championships from 2002 to 2008.

He is engaged to the Italian mountain running champion Elisa Desco, the two have a daughter named Lidia.

Achievements

World Cup wins
Sky running

National titles
Italian Mountain Running Championships
Mountain running: 2002, 2003, 2004 (3)
Italian Long Distance Mountain Running Championships
Long distance mountain running: 2014
Italian Vertical Kilometer Championships (FISKY version)
Vertical kilometer: 2012

See also
 Italy at the European Mountain Running Championships
 Italy at the World Mountain Running Championships

References

External links
 
 
 Marco De Gasperi at FIDAL 
  
 

1977 births
Living people
Italian male mountain runners
Italian male long-distance runners
Athletics competitors of Gruppo Sportivo Forestale
Italian sky runners
World Mountain Running Championships winners